Spruce Finance, headquartered in San Francisco, California is a consumer finance company specializing in the residential solar finance and efficiency home improvement sectors in the U.S. The company was founded in 2015 when Clean Power Finance merged with Kilowatt Financial and is led by CEO Nat Kreamer, co-founder of Sunrun.

The company operates its efficiency business in 50 states and its solar business in 25 states: Arizona, California, Colorado, Connecticut, Delaware, Florida, Hawaii, Louisiana, Maryland, Massachusetts, Minnesota, Missouri, Nevada, New Mexico, New Hampshire, New Jersey, New York, Oregon, Pennsylvania, Rhode Island, South Carolina, Texas, Utah, Vermont and Washington.

Controversies
Spruce has bought several leasing contracts from companies that either sold their holdings or went out of business.  When this occurs, their customer service is very weak.  Billing mistakes, poor communication, and loss of service with the panels is common.  Spruce has dozens of complaints with the Better Business Bureau of Houston and is one of the worst reviewed solar energy companies in the market today.  They claim that they are in a transition period but this has been going on for over two years now (as of the fall of 2022).

Investors
Spruce is a private company backed by investors that include Kleiner Perkins Caufield & Byers, Google Ventures (GV), Duke Energy, Edison International, Dominion Resources, and Claremont Creek Ventures.

References

Financial services companies based in California
Companies based in San Francisco
2015 establishments in California